Trusse Rupert Brown Norris (born August 10, 1937) is a former American football player who played one season with the Los Angeles Chargers. He played college football at the University of California, Los Angeles.

References

1937 births
Living people
American football ends
UCLA Bruins football players
Los Angeles Chargers players
Players of American football from Houston